A revisit (from re- (again, anew) + visit) literally means visit again, such as:
Satellite revisit 
Patient revisit to a setting of ambulatory care

See also
Revisionism (disambiguation)
Fictional revisionism